The Vault of Secrets is the second serial of the fourth series of the British science fiction television series The Sarah Jane Adventures. It first aired in two parts on CBBC on 18 and 19 October 2010. It features the return of Androvax, previously seen in the episode Prisoner of the Judoon, and of the android servants of the Alliance of Shades, last seen in the Doctor Who special Dreamland.

Plot
In 1972, ufologist Ocean Waters had her mind wiped by the robotic Men in Black, who gave her one of two activation discs to a hyperdimensional vault on Earth containing the last members of the Veil race, besides Androvax, in cryogenic sleep.

In the present, Androvax, after being imprisoned by the Judoon, escapes and attempts to open the vault, hidden in an asylum. He fails after only obtaining one of the two required discs. Wounded by a venomous viper and chased by the Men in Black that guard the vault, he asks Sarah Jane for help rescuing his race. Tricking Sarah Jane, Androvax finds Ocean and steals her disc. Androvax controls Rani's mother Gita and steals her van to return to the vault. Sarah Jane refuses to help him because when the Veil are reawakened and their spaceship takes off, the dimensional disturbance will destroy Earth.

Clyde jumps away from an incineration blast from two Men in Black, and the two men destroy each other. At Sarah Jane's urging, the last of the Men in Black, Mister Dread, gives up his energy to safely teleport the spaceship into space, to allow Androvax and the Veil to leave Earth without harming the planet. Before powering down, Mister Dread wipes Gita's memories of alien life.

Continuity
 Flashbacks to Prisoner of the Judoon are featured.
 Part One references the 1976 Doctor Who serial Pyramids of Mars.
 The Men in Black appeared in the Doctor Who animated adventure, Dreamland.

Notes

References

External links

2010 British television episodes
The Sarah Jane Adventures episodes